Jyotibacha Navas is a Marathi movie released on 15 April 1975.

Cast 

The cast includes:

Suryakant
Vikram Gokhale
Padma Chavan
Rajshekar
Bhalchandra Kulkarni
Dhumal
Vatsala Deshmukh
Ramchandra Varde
Dinkar Inamdar

Soundtrack
The music is provided by Sudhir Phadke and lyrics by Jagdish Khebudkar.

Track listing

References

External links 
  Movie Album - hummaa.com
  Movie Details - imindb.com 
 Marathi film lyricist Khebudkar is no more - dnaindia.com
 

1975 films
1970s Marathi-language films